Gabriel Segal may refer to:

 Gabriel Segal (philosopher) (born 1959), British philosopher
 Gabriel Segal (soccer) (born 2001), American footballer